Maria Dolores Molina (born 2 August 1966) is a road cyclist from Guatemala. She represented her nation at the 2004 Summer Olympics in the women's road race finishing 50th. In 2011, she became national time trial champion.

References

External links
 Profile at Cyclingarchives.com

Guatemalan female cyclists
Cyclists at the 2003 Pan American Games
Cyclists at the 2004 Summer Olympics
Olympic cyclists of Guatemala
Living people
Place of birth missing (living people)
1966 births
Central American and Caribbean Games gold medalists for Guatemala
Competitors at the 2002 Central American and Caribbean Games
Central American and Caribbean Games medalists in cycling
Pan American Games competitors for Guatemala
Pan American Games medalists in cycling
21st-century Guatemalan women
Pan American Games silver medalists for Guatemala
Medalists at the 2003 Pan American Games